Raphael Märki (born 5 June 1992) is a Swiss curler from Bern. He competed at the 2015 Ford World Men's Curling Championship in Halifax, Nova Scotia, Canada, as lead for the Swiss team, which placed seventh in the tournament.

References

External links
 

1992 births
Living people
Swiss male curlers
Sportspeople from Bern
Swiss curling champions